William Franks may refer to:

 William Joseph Franks (1830–1880), United States Navy sailor and Medal of Honor recipient
 William Franks (died 1790), English property developer
 William Franks (landowner) (died 1797), English landowner
 William Franks (cricketer), (1820–1879)
 William Sadler Franks (1851–1935), British astronomer